The Men's 50 metre rifle three positions event was a shooting sports event held as part of the Shooting at the 1964 Summer Olympics programme. It was the fourth appearance of the event. The competition was held on 20 October 1964 at the shooting ranges in Tokyo. 53 shooters from 33 nations competed.

Results

References

Shooting at the 1964 Summer Olympics
Men's 050m 3 positions 1964